Prairie Village is a city in Johnson County, Kansas, United States, and located within the Kansas City Metropolitan Area.  As of the 2020 census, the population of the city was 22,957.

History 

After the successful development of the Country Club Plaza in Kansas City, Missouri, J. C. Nichols turned toward development of his native Johnson County, just a few miles from the Plaza. Prairie Village was platted in 1941 and was named after Prairie School, which was established almost a century before. In 1949, Prairie Village was named the best planned community in America by the National Association of Home Builders. It was officially recognized as a city in 1951.

Remnants of the Santa Fe Trail are found in the city.

Shawnee, Osage, and Kansa Indians formerly inhabited the land now developed into the City of Prairie Village. In 1858, Thomas Porter bought 160 acres of farmland in what is now Prairie Village; he raised all his children on that farmland and was involved in agricultural development and civic affairs.

Porter's sister, Betty Porter, married Thompson A. Lewis, who owned 80 acres between Mission Road and Roe Avenue.

Henry Coppock arrived in Johnson County in 1857, before heading farther west to work in freighting and farming. He came back in the mid-1860s and bought land in 1865. Coppock built his family home on 900 acres in Prairie Village. Coppock's house stood for 30 years. Now on his land is Homestead County Club.

The original Prairie School was built in 1882, and a new building was constructed in 1912. This landmark was a community treasure until 1990.

In the 1940s, J.C. Nichols, an experienced developer, wanted to turn the farmland into suburban housing for soldiers returning home from the war. Nichols bought farmland from the Porters, Coppocks, and Lewises. There were hurdles along the way including a lack of experienced builders after World War II, but this didn't stop Nichols from pursuing his goal.

Prairie Village continued to expand as the Prairie Village Shopping Center opened in 1947 and the Corinth Square Shopping Center opened in 1955.

Geography

Climate

Demographics

2020 census
As of the census of 2020, there were 22,957 people and 9,955 households in the city. The racial makeup of the city was 94.2% White, .9% African American, 0.1% Native American, 1.0% Asian, and 3.7% from two or more races. Hispanic or Latino of any race were 4.7% of the population.

There were 9,955 households. 21.9% had children under the age of 18. The average household size was 2.22.

21.9% of residents were under the age of 18 and 20.0% were 65 years of age or older. The gender makeup of the city was 45.2% male and 54.8% female.

2010 census
As of the census of 2010, there were 21,447 people, 9,771 households, and 5,816 families living in the city. The racial makeup of the city was 95.3% White, 1.0% African American, 0.2% Native American, 1.4% Asian, 0.5% from other races, and 1.6% from two or more races. Hispanic or Latino of any race were 3.4% of the population.

There were 9,771 households. 26.3% had children under the age of 18, 48.8% were married couples living together, 8.1% had a female householder with no husband present, 2.6% had a male householder with no wife present, and 40.5% were non-families. 34.1% of all households were made up of individuals, and 12.9% had someone living alone aged 65 years or older. The average household size was 2.18 and the average family size was 2.82.

The median age in the city was 41.4 years. 21% of residents were under the age of 18; 5% were between the ages of 18 and 24; 28.4% were from 25 to 44; 27.7% were from 45 to 64; and 17.9% were 65 years of age or older. The gender makeup of the city was 46.5% male and 53.5% female.

2000 census
As of the census of 2000, there were 22,072 people, 9,833 households, and 6,165 families living in the city. The racial makeup of the city was 96.15% White, 0.78% African American, 0.16% Native American, 1.13% Asian, 0.03% Pacific Islander, 0.64% from other races, and 1.11% from two or more races. Hispanic or Latino of any race were 2.27% of the population.

There were 9,833 households. 26.6% had children under the age of 18, 52.8% were married couples living together, 7.9% had a female householder with no husband present, and 37.3% were non-families. 32.6% of all households were made up of individuals, and 13.8% had someone living alone who was 65 years of age or older. The average household size was 2.23 and the average family size was 2.84.

In the city, the population was spread out, with 22.2% under the age of 18, 4.6% from 18 to 24, 29.6% from 25 to 44, 24.0% from 45 to 64, and 19.6% who were 65 years of age or older. The median age was 41 years. For every 100 females, there were 85.0 males. For every 100 females age 18 and over, there were 80.2 males.

As of 2000 the median income for a household in the city was $58,685, and the median income for a family was $70,602 (these figures had risen to $71,646 and $88,185 respectively as of a 2007 estimate). Males had a median income of $50,428 versus $37,321 for females. The per capita income for the city was $34,677. About 1.4% of families and 2.5% of the population were below the poverty line, including 2.6% of those under age 18 and 2.5% of those age 65 or over.

Economy

Largest employers
According to the city's 2018 Comprehensive Annual Financial Report, the largest employers in the city are:

Education 
Public education in Prairie Village is administered by the Shawnee Mission School District.  Middle school students attend Indian Hills Middle School, whose mascot is the Knight.  High school students attend Shawnee Mission East High School.

Libraries 
The Johnson County Library serves residents of Prairie Village. The library's branch is in Prairie Village.

Sister cities
  Dolyna, Ivano-Frankivsk Oblast, Ukraine
  Schaerbeek, Belgium

Notable people 

Notable individuals who were born in and/or have lived in Prairie Village include actress and dancer Sandahl Bergman, and former Governor of Kansas Robert Bennett.

Gallery

References

Further reading

External links

 City of Prairie Village
 Prairie Village - Directory of Public Officials
 Prairie Village city map, KDOT

Cities in Kansas
Cities in Johnson County, Kansas
Cities in Kansas City metropolitan area
Populated places established in 1941
1941 establishments in Kansas